Soyuz-18 Rock is a distinctive nunatak 3 nautical miles (6 km) west of Cheney Bluff in the Cook Mountains. The feature rises to 1230 m and is pyramid shaped, especially when viewed from the west. Named after the Soviet spacecraft Soyuz 18 of May 24, 1975.

Nunataks of Oates Land